The 2020 Montana Democratic presidential primary took place on June 2, 2020, as one of eight delayed and regular primaries on the same day in the Democratic Party primaries for the 2020 presidential election. The Montana primary was an open primary, with the state awarding 25 delegates to the 2020 Democratic National Convention, of whom 19 were pledged delegates allocated on the basis of the primary results.

Former vice president and presumptive nominee Joe Biden won the primary with more than 74% of the vote and won all delegates except one, crossing the necessary majority of 1,991 delegates to officially win the Democratic nomination three days later during the vote count, while Senator Bernie Sanders narrowly missed the threshold for statewide delegates with 14.7%, winning one delegate, and Senator Elizabeth Warren received the remaining 8%.

Procedure
Montana was one of seven states and the District of Columbia to vote on June 2, 2020, in the Democratic primaries, along with Indiana, Maryland, New Mexico, Pennsylvania, Rhode Island and South Dakota. Four of those states had moved their elections to June due to the COVID-19 pandemic in the United States.

Voting took place throughout the state from 7 a.m. until 8 p.m. In the open primary, instead of using Montana's at-large congressional district, candidates had to meet a threshold of 15% in an eastern and a western district of the state (roughly coterminous with the boundaries of the state's two former congressional districts after the 1980 redistricting) to be considered viable. The 19 pledged delegates to the 2020 Democratic National Convention were allocated proportionally on the basis of the primary results. Of these, 6 and 7 were allocated to the eastern and western districts and another 2 were allocated to party leaders and elected officials (PLEO delegates), in addition to 4 at-large delegates. Originally planned with 16 delegates, the final number included a 20% bonus of 3 additional delegates on the 11 district and 3 at-large delegates by the Democratic National Committee due to the June date, which belonged to Stage III on the primary timetable.

On June 4, county caucuses met to designate state convention delegates, and at the state convention on June 6, all pledged national convention delegates were elected. The delegation also included 6 unpledged PLEO delegates: 4 members of the Democratic National Committee, one senator, and the governor Steve Bullock.

Candidates
The following candidates appeared on the ballot:
Joe Biden
Bernie Sanders (withdrawn)
Elizabeth Warren (withdrawn)
There was also a "no preference" option.

Polling
Polls with a sample size of <100 are marked in red to indicate a lack of reliability.

Results

See also
 2020 Montana Republican presidential primary

Notes

References

External links
The Green Papers delegate allocation summary
Montana Democratic Party draft delegate selection plan

Montana Democratic
Democratic primary
2020